In mathematics, the sieve of Eratosthenes is an ancient algorithm for finding all prime numbers up to any given limit.

It does so by iteratively marking as composite (i.e., not prime) the multiples of each prime, starting with the first prime number, 2. The multiples of a given prime are generated as a sequence of numbers starting from that prime, with constant difference between them that is equal to that prime. This is the sieve's key distinction from using trial division to sequentially test each candidate number for divisibility by each prime. Once all the multiples of each discovered prime have been marked as composites, the remaining unmarked numbers are primes.

The earliest known reference to the sieve (kóskinon Eratosthénous) is in Nicomachus of Gerasa's Introduction to Arithmetic, an early 2nd cent. CE book which attributes it to Eratosthenes of Cyrene, a 3rd cent. BCE Greek mathematician, though describing the sieving by odd numbers instead of by primes.

One of a number of prime number sieves, it is one of the most efficient ways to find all of the smaller primes. It may be used to find primes in arithmetic progressions.

Overview

A prime number is a natural number that has exactly two distinct natural number divisors: the number 1 and itself.

To find all the prime numbers less than or equal to a given integer  by Eratosthenes' method:

 Create a list of consecutive integers from 2 through : .
 Initially, let  equal 2, the smallest prime number.
 Find the smallest number in the list greater than  that is not marked. If there was no such number, stop. Otherwise, let  now equal this new number (which is the next prime), and repeat from step 3.
 When the algorithm terminates, the numbers remaining not marked in the list are all the primes below .

The main idea here is that every value given to  will be prime, because if it were composite it would be marked as a multiple of some other, smaller prime. Note that some of the numbers may be marked more than once (e.g., 15 will be marked both for 3 and 5).

This actually appears in the original algorithm.

Example
To find all the prime numbers less than or equal to 30, proceed as follows.

First, generate a list of integers from 2 to 30:

  2  3  4  5  6  7  8  9 10 11 12 13 14 15 16 17 18 19 20 21 22 23 24 25 26 27 28 29 30

The first number in the list is 2; cross out every 2nd number in the list after 2 by counting up from 2 in increments of 2 (these will be all the multiples of 2 in the list):

  2  3  5  7  9  11  13  15  17  19  21  23  25  27  29 

The next number in the list after 2 is 3; cross out every 3rd number in the list after 3 by counting up from 3 in increments of 3 (these will be all the multiples of 3 in the list):

  2  3  5  7  11  13  17  19  23  25  29 

The next number not yet crossed out in the list after 3 is 5; cross out every 5th number in the list after 5 by counting up from 5 in increments of 5 (i.e. all the multiples of 5):

  2  3  5  7  11  13  17  19  23  29 

The next number not yet crossed out in the list after 5 is 7; the next step would be to cross out every 7th number in the list after 7, but they are all already crossed out at this point, as these numbers (14, 21, 28) are also multiples of smaller primes because 7 × 7 is greater than 30. The numbers not crossed out at this point in the list are all the prime numbers below 30:

  2  3     5     7          11    13          17    19          23                29

Algorithm and variants

Pseudocode
The sieve of Eratosthenes can be expressed in pseudocode, as follows:

 algorithm Sieve of Eratosthenes is
     input: an integer n > 1.
     output: all prime numbers from 2 through n.
 
     let A be an array of Boolean values, indexed by integers 2 to n,
     initially all set to true.
     
     for i = 2, 3, 4, ..., not exceeding  do
         if A[i] is true
             for j = i2, i2+i, i2+2i, i2+3i, ..., not exceeding n do
                 set A[j] := false
 
     return all i such that A[i] is true.

Segmented sieve
As Sorenson notes, the problem with the sieve of Eratosthenes is not the number of operations it performs but rather its memory requirements. For large , the range of primes may not fit in memory; worse, even for moderate , its cache use is highly suboptimal. The algorithm walks through the entire array , exhibiting almost no locality of reference.

A solution to these problems is offered by segmented sieves, where only portions of the range are sieved at a time. These have been known since the 1970s, and work as follows:

 Divide the range 2 through  into segments of some size .
 Find the primes in the first (i.e. the lowest) segment, using the regular sieve.
 For each of the following segments, in increasing order, with  being the segment's topmost value, find the primes in it as follows:
 Set up a Boolean array of size .
 The remaining non-marked positions in the array correspond to the primes in the segment.

For ranges with upper limit  so large that the sieving primes below  as required by the page segmented sieve of Eratosthenes cannot fit in memory, a slower but much more space-efficient sieve like the sieve of Sorenson can be used instead.

Incremental sieve
The generation must be initiated only when the prime's square is reached, to avoid adverse effects on efficiency. It can be expressed symbolically under the dataflow paradigm as

 primes = [2, 3, ...] \ [[p², p²+p, ...] for p in primes],

using list comprehension notation with \ denoting set subtraction of arithmetic progressions of numbers.

Primes can also be produced by iteratively sieving out the composites through divisibility testing by sequential primes, one prime at a time. It is not the sieve of Eratosthenes but is often confused with it, even though the sieve of Eratosthenes directly generates the composites instead of testing for them. Trial division has worse theoretical complexity than that of the sieve of Eratosthenes in generating ranges of primes.

When testing each prime, the optimal trial division algorithm uses all prime numbers not exceeding its square root, whereas the sieve of Eratosthenes produces each composite from its prime factors only, and gets the primes "for free", between the composites. The widely known 1975 functional sieve code by David Turner is often presented as an example of the sieve of Eratosthenes but is actually a sub-optimal trial division sieve.

Algorithmic complexity
The sieve of Eratosthenes is a popular way to benchmark computer performance. The time complexity of calculating all primes below  in the random access machine model is  operations, a direct consequence of the fact that the prime harmonic series asymptotically approaches . It has an exponential time complexity with regard to input size, though, which makes it a pseudo-polynomial algorithm. The basic algorithm requires  of memory.

A special (rarely, if ever, implemented) segmented version of the sieve of Eratosthenes, with basic optimizations, uses  operations and  bits of memory.

Using big O notation ignores constant factors and offsets that may be very significant for practical ranges: The sieve of Eratosthenes variation known as the Pritchard wheel sieve has an  performance, but its basic implementation requires either a "one large array" algorithm which limits its usable range to the amount of available memory else it needs to be page segmented to reduce memory use. When implemented with page segmentation in order to save memory, the basic algorithm still requires about  bits of memory (much more than the requirement of the basic page segmented sieve of Eratosthenes using  bits of memory). Pritchard's work reduced the memory requirement at the cost of a large constant factor. Although the resulting wheel sieve has  performance and an acceptable memory requirement, it is not faster than a reasonably Wheel Factorized basic sieve of Eratosthenes for practical sieving ranges.

Euler's sieve
Euler's proof of the zeta product formula contains a version of the sieve of Eratosthenes in which each composite number is eliminated exactly once. On each step the first element is identified as the next prime, is multiplied with each element of the list (thus starting with itself), and the results are marked in the list for subsequent deletion. The initial element and the marked elements are then removed from the working sequence, and the process is repeated:
  
  [2] (3) 5  7  9  11  13 15 17 19 21 23 25 27 29 31 33 35 37 39 41 43 45 47 49 51 53 55 57 59 61 63 65 67 69 71 73 75 77 79  ...
  [3]    (5) 7     11  13    17 19    23 25    29 31    35 37    41 43    47 49    53 55    59 61    65 67    71 73    77 79  ...
  [4]       (7)    11  13    17 19    23       29 31       37    41 43    47 49    53       59 61       67    71 73    77 79  ...
  [5]             (11) 13    17 19    23       29 31       37    41 43    47       53       59 61       67    71 73       79  ...
  [...]

Here the example is shown starting from odds, after the first step of the algorithm. Thus, on the th step all the remaining multiples of the th prime are removed from the list, which will thereafter contain only numbers coprime with the first  primes (cf. wheel factorization), so that the list will start with the next prime, and all the numbers in it below the square of its first element will be prime too.

Thus, when generating a bounded sequence of primes, when the next identified prime exceeds the square root of the upper limit, all the remaining numbers in the list are prime. In the example given above that is achieved on identifying 11 as next prime, giving a list of all primes less than or equal to 80.

See also
 Sieve of Pritchard
 Sieve of Atkin
 Sieve of Sundaram
 Sieve theory

References

External links
 primesieve – Very fast highly optimized C/C++ segmented Sieve of Eratosthenes
 Eratosthenes, sieve of at Encyclopaedia of Mathematics
 Interactive JavaScript Page
 Sieve of Eratosthenes by George Beck, Wolfram Demonstrations Project.
 Sieve of Eratosthenes in Haskell
 Sieve of Eratosthenes algorithm illustrated and explained. Java and C++ implementations.
 A related sieve written in x86 assembly language
 Fast optimized highly parallel  CUDA segmented Sieve of Eratosthenes in C
 SieveOfEratosthenesInManyProgrammingLanguages c2 wiki page
 The Art of Prime Sieving Sieve of Eratosthenes in C from 1998 with nice features and algorithmic tricks explained.

Primality tests
Articles with example pseudocode
 
Algorithms